German submarine U-630 was a Type VIIC U-boat built for Nazi Germany's Kriegsmarine for service during World War II.
She was laid down on 23 August 1941 by Blohm & Voss, Hamburg as yard number 606, launched on 12 May 1942 and commissioned on 9 July 1942 under Oberleutnant zur See Werner Winkler.

Design
German Type VIIC submarines were preceded by the shorter Type VIIB submarines. U-630 had a displacement of  when at the surface and  while submerged. She had two shafts and two  propellers.

U-630 was fitted with five  torpedo tubes (four fitted at the bow and one at the stern), fourteen torpedoes, one  SK C/35 naval gun, 220 rounds, and one twin  C/30 anti-aircraft gun. The boat had a complement of between forty-four and sixty.

Service history
The boat's career began with training at 5th U-boat Flotilla on 9 July 1942, followed by active service on 1 April 1943 as part of the 3rd Flotilla for the remainder of her service.

Convoy HX 231
Convoy HX 231 set out across the Atlantic on 30 March 1943, only one U-tanker,  was at sea, and she had sixteen U-boats queuing up to be topped up. These boats formed the wolfpack Löwenherz.

On 4 April  attacked and damaged both the  British motor vessel Shillong and  British steamer Waroonga. U-630 is credited with finishing off both wounded vessels on the following day.

Fate
All hands were lost.

Wolfpacks
U-630 took part in four wolfpacks, namely:
 Löwenherz (1 – 10 April 1943)
 Lerche (10 – 15 April 1943)
 Specht (22 April – 4 May 1943)
 Fink (4 – 6 May 1943)

Summary of raiding history

References

Bibliography

External links

German Type VIIC submarines
1942 ships
U-boats commissioned in 1942
Ships lost with all hands
U-boats sunk in 1943
U-boats sunk by depth charges
U-boats sunk by British warships
World War II shipwrecks in the Atlantic Ocean
World War II submarines of Germany
Ships built in Hamburg
Maritime incidents in May 1943